Ioane Ioane (born 1962 in Christchurch) is a New Zealand artist of Samoan descent.  His work is informed by his Samoan heritage and includes performance, film, painting, installation and sculpture. In conversation about his work Fale Sā with art historian Caroline Vercoe, Ioane states, Sacred places are not necessarily a church, but it's a place where one likes to be in, a place of affirmation. Curator Ron Brownson writes, Ioane's attitude to sculptural process is cosmological – his carvings bind present reality with a representation of the past.
 
In 2005 Ioane won the Creative New Zealand Pacific Innovation and Excellence Art Award. His work is held in both private and public collections, including the Auckland Art Gallery; the Museum of New Zealand Te Papa Tongarewa; University of Cambridge Museum of Archaeology and Anthropology, England; the National University of Samoa; the Tjibaou Cultural Centre, Nouméa, New Caledonia; the Wallace Arts Trust, Auckland; and the University of Auckland Art Collection.

Education
In 1985 Ioane received a Bachelor of Fine Arts from the Elam School of Fine Arts at Auckland University. In 1986 he earned a diploma in teaching from the Auckland College of Education. In 1996 he received a post graduate diploma in fine arts from Elam.

Selected exhibitions
2015 Te Wā Tōiri: Fluid Horizon Auckland Art Gallery 
2013 Mannequin, Lopdell House Gallery
2012 Home AKL, Auckland Art Gallery
2012 I will sea you in Hawaiki Mangere Arts Centre, Nga Tohu O Uenuku
2012 Poly Wants a Cracker, City Gallery Wellington.
2008 Samoan Contemporary, Pataka Art + Museum, Porirua.
 2008 Te Tataitanga / Bind Together, Southwest School of Art & Craft, San Antonio, Texas, USA
2007 Le Folauga Auckland War Memorial Museum
2006 Pasifika Styles, Museum of Archaeology and Anthropology, University of Cambridge
2004 Paradise Now? Contemporary Art from the Pacific, Asia Society Museum, New York 
2002 Pacific Notion, Whitespace Gallery Auckland
1999 Fale Sā Auckland Art Gallery.
1992 Bottled Ocean, Auckland Art Gallery
 1990 Te Moemoea no Iotefa, Sarjeant Art Gallery, Whanganui.
1990 3 Polynesian Artists, McDougall Art Annex Christchurch

References

1962 births
Samoan artists
Samoan sculptors
20th-century New Zealand artists
Living people
21st-century New Zealand artists
20th-century New Zealand male artists
21st-century New Zealand male artists
20th-century New Zealand sculptors
21st-century New Zealand sculptors
20th-century New Zealand painters
21st-century New Zealand painters
New Zealand people of Samoan descent
New Zealand filmmakers
Artists from Christchurch